Nicola G. "Nicky" Best is a statistician known for her work on the deviance information criterion in Bayesian inference and as a developer of Bayesian inference using Gibbs sampling. She is a former professor of biostatistics and epidemiology at Imperial College London and is currently a biostatistician for GlaxoSmithKline.

Education and career
Best earned a master's degree in medical statistics from the University of Leicester in 1990 and then a PhD in biostatistics from the University of Cambridge, supervised by David Spiegelhalter. She joined the Imperial College faculty in 1996. She moved from Imperial to GlaxoSmithKline in 2014.

She was editor-in-chief of the Journal of the Royal Statistical Society, Series A (Statistics in Society), from 2001 to 2004.

Recognition
Best won the Guy Medal in Bronze of the Royal Statistical Society in 2004. In 2018, she won the Bradford Hill Medal of the Royal Statistical Society "for her exquisite expositions of Bayesian methods through BUGS software, workshops, lectures, prior elicitations, textbooks and peer-review publications; and for substantive applications ranging from clinical trials and cost-effectiveness to epidemiology and, most recently, the optimization of pharmaceutical research programmes".

Selected publications

References

External links

Year of birth missing (living people)
Living people
British statisticians
Women statisticians
Alumni of the University of Leicester
Alumni of the University of Cambridge
Academics of Imperial College London
Academic journal editors